Senam Langueh (born 23 February 1979) is a Togolese former international footballer who played as a defender.

Career
Langueh has played club football in Togo, Belgium and France for ASKO Kara, RCS Verviétois, Excelsior Virton, Union Royale Namur, Eupen, Walhain and Rochefort FC.

He made his international debut for Togo in 2003.

References

1979 births
Living people
Togolese footballers
Togo international footballers
ASKO Kara players
R.C.S. Verviétois players
R.E. Virton players
Union Royale Namur Fosses-La-Ville players
K.A.S. Eupen players
R. Wallonia Walhain Chaumont-Gistoux players
Association football defenders
Togolese expatriate footballers
Togolese expatriate sportspeople in Belgium
Expatriate footballers in Belgium
Togolese expatriate sportspeople in France
Expatriate footballers in France
21st-century Togolese people